The 2015 Kansas State Wildcats baseball team will represent Kansas State University during the 2015 NCAA Division I baseball season. The Wildcats will play their home games at Tointon Family Stadium as a member of the Big 12 Conference. They will be led by head coach Brad Hill, in his 12th season at Kansas State.

Previous season
In 2014, the Wildcats finished the season 9th in the Big 12 with a record of 25–30, 5–18 in conference play. They failed to qualify for the 2014 Big 12 Conference baseball tournament or the 2014 NCAA Division I baseball tournament.

Personnel

Roster

Coaching staff

Schedule

! style="background:#512888;color:white;"| Regular Season
|- valign="top" 

|- bgcolor="#bbffbb"
| February 13 || vs.  ||  || Charlotte Sports Park • Port Charlotte, FL || W 5–4 || Floyd (1–0) || Grant (0–1) || Halbohn (1) || 432 || 1–0 || –
|- bgcolor="#bbffbb"
| February 14 || vs. Pittsburgh ||  || North Charlotte Regional Park • Port Charlotte, FL || W 7–0 || MaVorhis (1–0) || Berube (0–1) ||  || N/A || 2–0 || –
|- bgcolor="#ffbbbb"
| February 14 || vs.  ||  || North Charlotte Regional Park • Port Charlotte, FL || L 0–5 || Williams (1–0) || Biesma (0–1) ||  || N/A || 2–1 || –
|- bgcolor="#ffbbbb"
| February 15 || vs.  ||  || North Charlotte Regional Park • Port Charlotte, FL || L 4–7 || Plohr (1–0) || Floyd (1–1) ||  || N/A || 2–2 || –
|- bgcolor="#bbffbb"
| February 19 || vs.  ||  || Surprise Stadium • Surprise, AZ || W 3–2 || Griep (1–0) || Drachler (0–2) ||  || N/A || 3–2 || –
|- bgcolor="#ffbbbb"
| February 20 || vs. Oregon State ||  || Surprise Stadium • Surprise, AZ || L 9–10 || Hickey (2–0) || Floyd (1–2) ||  || 2,301 || 3–3 || –
|- bgcolor="#ffbbbb"
| February 21 || vs.  ||  || Sloan Park • Mesa, AZ || L 5–6 (10) || Jones (1–0) || Halbohn (0–1) ||  || 484 || 3–4 || –
|- bgcolor="#bbffbb"
| February 22 || vs.  ||  || Sloan Park • Mesa, AZ || W 12–3 || Fischer (1–0) || Leonard (0–1) ||  || 135 || 4–4 || –
|- bgcolor="#ffbbbb"
| February 28 || at  ||  || Evans Diamond • Berkeley, CA || L 2–4 || Jeffries (2–1) || Griep (1–1) || Nelson (1) || 336 || 4–5 || –
|-

|- bgcolor="#ffbbbb"
| March 1 || at California ||  || Evans Diamond • Berkeley, CA || L 2–6 || Mason (2–0) || Kalmus (0–1) || Muse-Fisher (2) || 451 || 4–6 || –
|- bgcolor="#ffbbbb"
| March 2 || at California ||  || Evans Diamond • Berkeley, CA || L 1–9 || Ladrech (2–1) || Fischer (1–1) ||  || 115 || 4–7 || –
|- bgcolor="#bbffbb"
| March 6 ||  ||  || Tointon Family Stadium • Manhattan, KS || W 4–1 || Griep (2–1) || Steffens (2–2) || Erickson (1) || 2,667 || 5–7 || –
|- bgcolor="#bbffbb"
| March 7 || Santa Clara ||  || Tointon Family Stadium • Manhattan, KS || W 17–5 || Floyd (2–2) || Wilson (1–1) ||  || 2,387 || 6–7 || –
|- bgcolor="#bbffbb"
| March 8 || Santa Clara ||  || Tointon Family Stadium • Manhattan, KS || W 10–3 || Douglas (1–0) || George (1–1) ||  || 2,331 || 7–7 || –
|- bgcolor="#bbffbb"
| March 10 ||  ||  || Tointon Family Stadium • Manhattan, KS || W 10–5 || Halbohn (1–1) || Elman (0–1) ||  || 2,520 || 8–7 || –
|- bgcolor="#ffbbbb"
| March 11 || Creighton ||  || Tointon Family Stadium • Manhattan, KS || L 3–6 || DeCaster (1–0) || Douglas (1–1) ||  || 2,203 || 8–8 || –
|- bgcolor="#bbffbb"
| March 13 ||  ||  || Tointon Family Stadium • Manhattan, KS || W 4–0 || Griep (3–1) || Hall (3–1) ||  || 2,849 || 9–8 || –
|- bgcolor="#bbffbb"
| March 14 || Missouri State ||  || Tointon Family Stadium • Manhattan, KS || W 10–6 || Douglas (2–1) || Cheray (2–2) ||  || 2,410 || 10–8 || –
|- bgcolor="#ffbbbb"
| March 15 || Missouri State ||  || Tointon Family Stadium • Manhattan, KS || L 7–10 || Young (1–0) || Erickson (0–1) ||  || 2,660 || 10–9 || –
|- bgcolor="#bbffbb"
| March 17 || at  ||  || Jaycees Field • Nacogdoches, TX || W 3–2 || Halbohn (2–1) || Stone (0–1) || Erickson (2) || 150 || 11–9 || –
|- bgcolor="#bbbbbb"
| March 18 || at Stephen F. Austin ||  || Jaycees Field • Nacogdoches, TX || colspan=7| Cancelled 
|- bgcolor="#ffbbbb"
| March 21 || at Texas ||  || UFCU Disch–Falk Field • Austin, TX || L 3–5 || Bellow (2–1) || Courville (0–1) || Culbreth (3) || 5,372 || 11–10 || 0–1
|- bgcolor="#ffbbbb"
| March 21 || at Texas ||  || UFCU Disch–Falk Field • Austin, TX || L 1–3 || Hollingsworth (3–1) || Calmus (0–2) || Bellow (2) || 5,372 || 11–11 || 0–2
|- bgcolor="#ffbbbb"
| March 22 || at Texas ||  || UFCU Disch–Falk Field • Austin, TX || L 1–6 || Clemens (2–1) || Fischer (1–2) || Mayes (1) || 5,695 || 11–12 || 0–3
|- bgcolor="#bbbbbb"
| March 25 ||  ||  || Tointon Family Stadium • Manhattan, KS || colspan=7| Postponed
|- bgcolor="#bbffbb"
| March 27 || at Oklahoma State ||  || Allie P. Reynolds Stadium • Stillwater, OK || W 4–2 || Fischer (2–2) || Perrin (2–3) ||  || 1,404 || 12–12 || 1–3
|- bgcolor="#ffbbbb"
| March 28 || at Oklahoma State ||  || Allie P. Reynolds Stadium • Stillwater, OK || L 3–12 || Buffett (2–1) || Halbohn (2–2) ||  || 2,224 || 12–13 || 1–4
|- bgcolor="#ffbbbb"
| March 29 || at Oklahoma State ||  || Allie P. Reynolds Stadium • Stillwater, OK || L 1–4 || Freeman (5–0) || Fischer (2–3) ||  || 1,802 || 12–14 || 1–5
|-

|- bgcolor="#bbffbb"
| April 2 || West Virginia ||  || Tointon Family Stadium • Manhattan, KS || W 8–2 || Fischer (3–3) || Dotson (0–3) ||  || 2,737 || 13–14 || 2–5
|- align="center" bgcolor=""
| April 3 || West Virginia ||  || Tointon Family Stadium • Manhattan, KS ||  ||  ||  ||  ||  ||  ||
|- align="center" bgcolor=""
| April 4 || West Virginia ||  || Tointon Family Stadium • Manhattan, KS ||  ||  ||  ||  ||  ||  ||
|- align="center" bgcolor=""
| April 7 ||  ||  || Tointon Family Stadium • Manhattan, KS ||  ||  ||  ||  ||  ||  ||
|- align="center" bgcolor=""
| April 8 || at Omaha ||  || Werner Park • Papillion, NE ||  ||  ||  ||  ||  ||  ||
|- align="center" bgcolor=""
| April 10 || TCU ||  || Tointon Family Stadium • Manhattan, KS ||  ||  ||  ||  ||  ||  ||
|- align="center" bgcolor=""
| April 11 || TCU ||  || Tointon Family Stadium • Manhattan, KS ||  ||  ||  ||  ||  ||  ||
|- align="center" bgcolor=""
| April 12 || TCU ||  || Tointon Family Stadium • Manhattan, KS ||  ||  ||  ||  ||  ||  ||
|- align="center" bgcolor=""
| April 14 ||  ||  || Tointon Family Stadium • Manhattan, KS ||  ||  ||  ||  ||  ||  ||
|- align="center" bgcolor=""
| April 17 || Texas Tech ||  || Tointon Family Stadium • Manhattan, KS ||  ||  ||  ||  ||  ||  ||
|- align="center" bgcolor=""
| April 18 || Texas Tech ||  || Tointon Family Stadium • Manhattan, KS ||  ||  ||  ||  ||  ||  ||
|- align="center" bgcolor=""
| April 19 || Texas Tech ||  || Tointon Family Stadium • Manhattan, KS ||  ||  ||  ||  ||  ||  ||
|- align="center" bgcolor=""
| April 21 || at Nebraska ||  || Haymarket Park • Lincoln, NE ||  ||  ||  ||  ||  ||  ||
|- align="center" bgcolor=""
| April 24 || at Baylor ||  || Baylor Ballpark • Waco, TX ||  ||  ||  ||  ||  ||  ||
|- align="center" bgcolor=""
| April 25 || at Baylor ||  || Baylor Ballpark • Waco, TX ||  ||  ||  ||  ||  ||  ||
|- align="center" bgcolor=""
| April 26 || at Baylor ||  || Baylor Ballpark • Waco, TX ||  ||  ||  ||  ||  ||  ||
|- align="center" bgcolor=""
| April 28 || at  ||  || Siebert Field • Minneapolis, MN ||  ||  ||  ||  ||  ||  ||
|- align="center" bgcolor=""
| April 29 || at Minnesota ||  || Siebert Field • Minneapolis, MN ||  ||  ||  ||  ||  ||  ||
|-

|- align="center" bgcolor=""
| May 1 ||  ||  || Tointon Family Stadium • Manhattan, KS ||  ||  ||  ||  ||  ||  ||
|- align="center" bgcolor=""
| May 2 || Arkansas State ||  || Tointon Family Stadium • Manhattan, KS ||  ||  ||  ||  ||  ||  ||
|- align="center" bgcolor=""
| May 3 || Arkansas State ||  || Tointon Family Stadium • Manhattan, KS ||  ||  ||  ||  ||  ||  ||
|- align="center" bgcolor=""
| May 5 || at Wichita State ||  || Eck Stadium • Wichita, KS ||  ||  ||  ||  ||  ||  ||
|- align="center" bgcolor=""
| May 8 || Oklahoma ||  || Tointon Family Stadium • Manhattan, KS ||  ||  ||  ||  ||  ||  ||
|- align="center" bgcolor=""
| May 9 || Oklahoma ||  || Tointon Family Stadium • Manhattan, KS ||  ||  ||  ||  ||  ||  ||
|- align="center" bgcolor=""
| May 10 || Oklahoma ||  || Tointon Family Stadium • Manhattan, KS ||  ||  ||  ||  ||  ||  ||
|- align="center" bgcolor=""
| May 15 || at Kansas ||  || Hoglund Ballpark • Lawrence, KS ||  ||  ||  ||  ||  ||  ||
|- align="center" bgcolor=""
| May 16 || at Kansas ||  || Hoglund Ballpark • Lawrence, KS ||  ||  ||  ||  ||  ||  ||
|- align="center" bgcolor=""
| May 17 || at Kansas ||  || Hoglund Ballpark • Lawrence, KS ||  ||  ||  ||  ||  ||  ||
|-

|- 
! style="background:#512888;color:white;"| Post-Season
|-

|- align="center"
|  || TBD || || ONEOK Field • Tulsa, OK ||  ||  ||  ||  ||  ||  || 
|- align="center"
|  || TBD || || ONEOK Field • Tulsa, OK ||  ||  ||  ||  ||  ||  || 
|-

|-
| style="font-size:88%"| All rankings from Collegiate Baseball.

References

Kansas State Wildcats
Kansas State Wildcats baseball seasons
Kansas State Wildcats Baseball